Flossie Cohen (1925–2004) was an Indian-born pediatric immunologist who spent most of her career at the Children's Hospital of Michigan. She was also a professor at the Wayne State University School of Medicine.

Biography
Cohen was born in 1925 in Kolkata, India. She later migrated to the United States and studied medicine at the University of Buffalo, graduating in 1950. She completed her residency in pediatrics at the Brooklyn Jewish Hospital, and moved to Michigan in 1953 to join the Children's Hospital of Michigan. There, she began research in the field of pediatric and neonatal immunology. She set up the hospital's clinical immunology laboratory and its service for clinical immunology and rheumatology; she directed both departments until her retirement in 1992. She was also a professor at the Wayne State University School of Medicine.

In 1972, Cohen was the co-author of a landmark study that was the first to demonstrate a biochemical basis for severe combined immunodeficiency. She continued to study immunodeficiency disorders, and with the outbreak of the HIV/AIDS epidemic in the 1980s, she started an HIV clinic at the Children's Hospital of Michigan in 1985. She was also involved in clinical trials for perinatal transmission of HIV.

In 1975, Cohen became the first person in Michigan to successfully perform a bone marrow transplant in a child. She was also the first person to fluoresce red blood cells. She was inducted into the Michigan Women's Hall of Fame in 1994 for her achievements in medicine and science, and died in 2004.

See also
 Timeline of women in science

References

1925 births
2004 deaths
American immunologists
Indian immunologists
American pediatricians
Women pediatricians
Indian paediatricians
Medical doctors from Kolkata
Physicians from Michigan
Indian emigrants to the United States
University at Buffalo alumni
Wayne State University faculty
Women scientists from West Bengal
20th-century Indian medical doctors
20th-century Indian women scientists
Indian women medical doctors
20th-century American women physicians
20th-century American physicians
American women academics
21st-century American women